The 2022 Louisiana–Monroe Warhawks baseball team represented the University of Louisiana at Monroe during the 2022 NCAA Division I baseball season. The Warhawks played their home games at Warhawk Field and were led by fifth-year head coach Michael Federico. They were members of the Sun Belt Conference.

Preseason

Signing Day Recruits

Sun Belt Conference Coaches Poll
The Sun Belt Conference Coaches Poll was released on February 9, 2022. Louisiana–Monroe was picked to finish ninth with 59 votes.

Preseason All-Sun Belt Team & Honors
No players from the Warhawks were chosen.

Personnel

Schedule and results

Schedule Source:
*Rankings are based on the team's current ranking in the D1Baseball poll.

References

Louisiana–Monroe
Louisiana–Monroe Warhawks baseball seasons
Louisiana–Monroe Warhawks baseball